Bolitoglossinae is a subfamily of lungless salamander. Most of them are native to tropical areas in Central and South America, though a few such as Batrachoseps are found in temperate regions. Its sister group is the extinct genus Palaeoplethodon.

Plethodontidae
Amphibian subfamilies
Taxa named by Edward Hallowell (herpetologist)